Ciné de Chef is a combined luxury movie theatre and gourmet restaurant, located in Apgujeong, southern Seoul. It is operated by CJ CGV, South Korea's largest multiplex movie theatre chain, and opened on 3 May 2007, drawing over 2000 viewers in its first few months.

The theatre seats just thirty people in deluxe chairs costing  each, and is equipped with 11.1 channel speakers which surround the entire theatre, including the floor and ceiling. In the restaurant, Le Cordon Bleu-certified chefs serve modern Asian cuisine. Other services provided by Ciné de Chef include valet parking, a private elevator, an escort service and English-speaking staff.

References

External links 
 

Event venues established in 2007
CJ CGV
Buildings and structures in Seoul
Gangnam District
Cinemas and movie theaters in Seoul
Restaurants in South Korea
2007 establishments in South Korea